Bleasby is a civil parish in the Newark and Sherwood district of Nottinghamshire, England.  The parish contains nine listed buildings that are recorded in the National Heritage List for England.  Of these, one is at Grade II*, the middle of the three grades, and the others are at Grade II, the lowest grade.  The parish contains the villages of Bleasby and Goverton and the surrounding area, and the listed buildings consist of a church and its former vicarage, other houses, one with an attached pump, a pigeoncote, and a war memorial.


Key

Buildings

References

Citations

Sources

 

Lists of listed buildings in Nottinghamshire